Port Link is a ro-pax ferry that was operated by Stena Line between Stranraer and Belfast.

History

The Port Link was built in 1980 as the St David for Sealink.  She was ordered to replace the Stena Normanica on the Fishguard - Rosslare route; instead she entered service alongside the St Columba on the Holyhead - Dún Laoghaire route

In 1985 the St David was transferred to Dover to operate a joint service with RMT to Ostend.

In 1990 Sea Containers sold Sealink British Ferries to Stena Line. The St David was renamed Stena Caledonia and returned to the Irish Sea, this time to the Stranraer - Larne route.

In order to meet the latest SOLAS regulations the Stena Caledonia was sent to Cammell Laird in 1999. Work included the addition of a duck tail sponson to the stern and a bulbous bow.

In 2009, her 29th year of service, the Stena Caledonia returned to Cammell Laird for a £1.8 million refit.

Future

In March 2011, Stena Line announced the Stena Caledonia and her running partners on the Belfast - Stranraer route (Stena Navigator and Stena Voyager) were to be replaced in Autumn 2011 by the Stena Superfast VII and Stena Superfast VIII chartered from Estonian ferry operator Tallink. Stena Caledonia completed her last commercial sailing for Stena Line on 21 November 2011 when she arrived in Stranraer at 0125 and left with last ever sailing from the port with the 0430 freight only service to Belfast. Stena Caledonia was sold to ASDP Indonesia Ferry of Indonesia and was subsequently was renamed Port Link.
She left Belfast for the last time on 3 July 2012 en route for Indonesia via Gibraltar & Suez Canal. She reached Port Said on 23 July and after several weeks at anchor, made passage through the Suez Canal on 6 September 2012 eventually reaching Jakarta, Indonesia on 12 October 2012. In April 2013 she was still in Jakarta and soon in service in Sunda Strait Merak - Bakauheuni on regular ferry services in 2012-2020 and in 2020-onwards this ship servicing as Executive Express Ferry in the same line.

Saint Class
The Port Link is the last of four similar ships built by Harland & Wolff, Belfast for Sealink between 1979 and 1980.

Most of her early career on the Stranraer run. Renamed Stena Galloway in 1991. Currently with IMTC, serving Algeciras - Tangiers, as Le Rif.

St AnselmServed as MS St Anselm. Renamed Stena Cambria in 1990. Various roles on English Channel and Irish Sea. With Baleària, served Barcelona - Ibiza, as Isla De Botafoc. The ship is currently operated by Ventouris ferries on route Bari-Durrës.

St ChristopherMost of her early career on the Irish Sea and the English Channel. Renamed Stena Antrim in 1990. Currently with Comanav as Ibn Batouta, operating between Algeciras - Tánger.

References

Notes

Bibliography

External links

Ferries of Northern Ireland
Ferries of Scotland
Ships built in Belfast
1980 ships
Ships of the Stena Line
Ships built by Harland and Wolff